Akadimia Podosfairou Lekanopediou Kallonis, commonly referred to Kalloni, was a Greek association football club based in Kalloni, Lesbos. They have competed in the Super League Greece from 2013 to 2016.

History
The club was established in 1994 after a merger of Arisvaios Kalloni (est. 1954) and Apollon Dafia (est. 1969), two clubs that had been based in villages in the wider area of Kalloni, the club's original seat.

2002–03 season
In 2002 they promoted in Delta Ethniki but they relegated to local championship of Lesbos. Being one of the weakest club of their group and without having any professional contract, they only achieved four wins.

2007–08 season
The advent of Prokopis Kartalis who had played at Alpha Ethniki as a player of Skoda Xanthi marks the beginning of the glorious course of the club. Kartalis emerged team's top scorer and AEL Kalloni easily won Lesbos local championship and the promotion to Delta Ethniki.

2008–09 season
In 2008–09 season, they promoted in Delta Ethniki and, even though outsider, they came close to take the first place. They were placed in a group that also competed Athenian clubs and finished 5th.

2009–10 season
During the 2009–2010 season AEL Kalloni, making an amazing second round and having the best defense and the second best goals for record in their group won the first place and, for the first time ever, promotion to Football League 2.

2010–11 season

In the club's first season in a professional league, in the North Group of Football League 2, they placed 2nd, a place that led them to a mini league (play-offs) against Vyzas, the 2nd-place team of South Group, and the third-placed teams of each group, Fokikos and Iraklis Psachna. The winner of the league would be promoted in Football League. However, due to the relegation of five clubs by the previous version Football League, play-offs were not carried out, so Kalloni promoted directly with all clubs that would have competed in play-offs, Anagennisi Giannitsa and Platanias to 2011–12 Football League.

Kalloni seasons

Delta Ethniki was abolished in 2013, as it was merged with Football League 2, the third tier of the Greek football league system.

Greek Cup appearances

Crest and colours

Apollon and Arisvaios' crests
Apollon Dafia's crest depicted the ancient god Apollo. The club's colours were blue and white.
The crest of Arisvaios Kalloni had vertical strips in green and white colour, in the center of which were shown two runners. Up and down of strips, the name of the club appeared.

Kalloni's original crest

Initially, it had been decided the colours of the new club to be green and white. After a malfunction of a printer, the green colours were printed in crimson. The executives of the club felt that this change would bring luck, so this variation was finally maintained.

There were two other variations, the one in blue and white and the other in yellow and blue.

New logo
A new crest was created in 2011 summer. It is a circle that in its interior has crimson and white vertical stripes and in its center there is a blue shield with two handshaking hands in laurel leaves at the bottom of which is written the establishment year, much like the original logo. In the exterior of the circle, the club's full name is indicated with white letters in blue background.

Ground
Kalloni uses the Mytilene Municipal Stadium. Until then, they used Kostas Kenteris stadium, situated in Kalloni. The stadium was built in 2002. It had one tier in its west, with a capacity about 900, all-seated. In 2010, when Kalloni promoted to Football League 2, some necessary repairs were made in order to make it appropriate for the proper conduct of matches. In 2009 a secondary field was constructed for training the first team and its academies. From 2011–12 season, the Mytilene Municipal Stadium has been made the club's home, because of the unsuitability of their physical home.

Honours

League
Football League 2 (III)
Runners-up: 2010–11

Delta Ethniki (IV)
Winners: 2009–10

Championship of Lesbos Football Clubs Association (V)
Winners (4): 1995–96, 1999–2000, 2001–02, 2007–08
Runners-up (4): 1997–98, 1998–99, 2005–06, 2006–07

Cup
 Cup of Lesbos Football Clubs Association
Winners (3): 1995–96, 2005–06, 2008–09
Runners-up: 2009–10

Players

Retired numbers

Club officials
 Owner & Chairman:  Nikos Michalakis

AEL Kalloni Football Club
 Chief executive Officer:  Prokopis Kartalis
 General manager:  Dimitris Aggelonias

Coaching and medical staff
 Head coach:  Dimitris Gavalas
 Assistant manager: TBA
 Goalkeepers' coach:  Giannis Georgiadis
 Fitness trainer:  Panagiotis Konomaras
 Club doctor:  Dimitris Varvagiannis

Managerial history

 Paraschos Laskaris (1994–96)
 Giorgos Spartalis (1997)
 unknown (1997–98)
 Panagiotis Pittos (1998)
 Petros Kalogirou (1999–2000)
 Simeon Vamvarapis (2000–01)
 unknown (2001–02)
 Giorgos Spartalis (2002–03)
 unknown (2003–06)
 Fotis Kokkinellis (2006)
 Giorgos Spartalis (2007)
 Prokopis Kartalis (2008)
 Sotiris Antoniou (2008–10)
 Michalis Kasapis (2010–11)
 Sotiris Antoniou (2011)
 Prokopis Kartalis (2011)
 Luciano de Souza (2011–12)
 Giannis Matzourakis (2012)
 Timos Kavakas (2012)
 Loukas Karadimos (2012)
 Babis Tennes (2012–13)
 Giannis Matzourakis (2013–15)
 Vangelis Vlachos (2015)
 Thalis Theodoridis (2015)
 Nikos Karageorgiou (2015–16)
 Giorgos Vazakas (2016)
 Dimitris Gavalas (2016–2017)

External links
 [ Official website] 

 
Defunct football clubs in Greece
Lesbos
Association football clubs established in 1994
1994 establishments in Greece
Football clubs in North Aegean